Gonarezhou National Park is a national park located in southeastern Zimbabwe. It is situated in a relatively remote corner of Masvingo Province, south of Chimanimani along the Mozambique border. Owing to its vast size, rugged terrain and its location away from main tourist routes, large tracts of Gonarezhou remain pristine wilderness.

At 5,053 km2, Gonarezhou is the country's second-largest national park, after Hwange National Park. The name Gonarezhou is translated from the Shona meaning "The Place of Elephants".

Gonarezhou National Park forms part of the Great Limpopo Transfrontier Park, a peace park that links Gonarezhou with the Kruger National Park in South Africa and the Limpopo National Park in Mozambique. Animals can move freely between the three sanctuaries. The northeastern end of Gonarezhou is located within the Zambezian and mopane woodlands, while the southwestern end is located within the Southern Africa bushveld ecoregion.

History

The Gonarezhou National Park was first established as a protected area in 1936 as a Game Reserve, eventually being proclaimed a National Park in 1975. The park has had a turbulent history and was closed to the public during the Rhodesian War and again during much of the Mozambique civil war but was re-opened in 1994. Between 1994 and 2007, the Gonarezhou National Park was wholly managed by the Zimbabwe Parks and Wildlife Management Authority, however the economic challenges in Zimbabwe up to 2007 meant that there was little reinvestment in infrastructure and protection of the Park. In 2007, the Zimbabwe Parks and Wildlife Management Authority entered into a financial and technical assistance model for the Gonarezhou National Park with the Frankfurt Zoological Society. This model lasted up until 2017 and focused on investing in infrastructure and the protection of the Park's resources. In March 2017, management of the Gonarezhou was handed over to the Gonarezhou Conservation Trust, a co-management partnership between the Zimbabwe Parks and Wildlife Management Authority and the Frankfurt Zoological Society. This co-management model, overseen by a board of trustees represented equally by both partners, was created to establish a platform to enhance investment into the long-term sustainability of the Park - a key feature of which being the retention of tourism funds at a Park level for direct reinvestment into the Gonarezhou.

Features
The Gonarezhou National Park is one of the iconic wilderness areas of Africa, with relatively few tourists but boasting an amazing diversity of landscapes, features, and growing wildlife populations. By far, the most well known and prominent feature of the Park is the Chilojo Cliffs, sandstone cliffs towering 180 meters high and running for some 20 kilometers along the south bank of the Runde River. Other key features in the north of the Park are the two large natural pans, Tembwahata and Machanu, formed at the junction of the Save River and Runde River. In the central and southern areas of the Park are the Naymtongwe Plateau, a remnant of the Chilojo Cliffs, the Ntambambomvu Red Hills, densely wooded hill slopes standing above the Malvernia sand beds and the Mwenezi River Valley, and the Samalema Gorge, where the Mwenezi River carves through solid igneous rock-forming a braided river gorge.

Fauna
Historically the park has been a habitat for the endangered Cape wild dog (Lycaon pictus); and in 2010 there were several sightings of wild dogs in the park. It is thought that the cross-border link to national parks in Mozambique would be the best opportunity to restore or preserve the viability of this species in adjacent national parks in South Africa and Mozambique. Other mammals that inhabit the park are elephant, giraffe, hippopotamus, Cape buffalo, zebra, wildebeest, black and white rhinoceros, lion, leopard, cheetah, and hyena.

Accommodation and camping

 Swimuwini Rest Camp - managed by the National Parks and Wildlife Authority, this is self-catering accommodation on the Mwenezi River.

Gallery

See also
 Chiredzi District
 Chiredzi River
 Malilangwe

References

National parks of Zimbabwe
1975 establishments in Rhodesia
Protected areas established in 1975
Geography of Masvingo Province
Chiredzi District
Mwenezi River
Tourist attractions in Masvingo Province
Protected areas established in 1936
Zambezian and mopane woodlands